Windward Islands Football Association (WIFA) is an association of the football playing nations in Windward Islands.

It is affiliated to CFU.

Its main tournament is the Windward Islands Tournament.

It has 4 members:

References

Association football governing bodies in the Caribbean